Villa Argentina is a resort (balneario) of the Costa de Oro in the Canelones Department of southern Uruguay. The famous eagle-shaped house overlooking the Río de la Plata, which is attributed to Atlántida, is in fact located in this resort.

Geography

Location
It shares borders with Atlántida to the east.

Population
In 2011 Villa Argentina had a population of 622.
 
Source: Instituto Nacional de Estadística de Uruguay

References

External links
INE map of Villa Argentina, Atlántida, Estación Atlántida, Las Toscas, City Golf, and Fortin de Santa Rosa

Populated places in the Canelones Department
Seaside resorts in Uruguay